"Lord Pretty Flacko Jodye 2 (LPFJ2)" is a song by the American hip hop recording artist, ASAP Rocky. The song, produced by Nez & Rio, was released on January 7, 2015, as the first official single from his second studio album, At. Long. Last. ASAP (2015).

Music video
A music video for the song, directed by Dexter Navy and ASAP Rocky, was released on February 10, 2015 in honor of Rocky's mentor, A$AP Yams.

Vinyl release
A white 7" vinyl record was released in 2015 to coincide with Record Store Day. The record included "Multiply" as its b-side.

Charts

Certifications

References

External links
 

2014 songs
2015 singles
ASAP Rocky songs
Songs written by ASAP Rocky